Catcher Technology Corporation, is an electronics casing manufacturing company founded on November 23, 1984. The company has since focused on making shells for electronics such as PC notebooks, cell phones, and cameras, using magnesium alloy die castings, aluminum alloys, zinc alloys, stainless steel or plastic. In 2004, Catcher Technology moved its headquarters from HaiChong Street to its current address, which was the original site of the headquarters of Taiwan Sugar Corporation YungKang Plant.

Catcher's current product revenue mix comes from cell phone casings (50%), PC/notebook (20%-30%), while tablets and others account for 10%-20%. Catcher is also a supplier for Apple, however, it failed to be included in the iPhone SE2 supply chain.

History

In 2010, Catcher's yearly revenue reached a new high of 21.8 billion twd.

In 2013 April, Catcher has under its assets, around 15,600 CNC machines.

See also
 可成科技
 Khó-sêng_Kho-ki
 Luxshare

References

External links
 

Companies listed on the Taiwan Stock Exchange
Taiwanese brands
Companies based in Tainan